The Hollywood Melrose Hotel, also known previously as the Melrose Arms and later as the Monte Cristo Island Apartments, is a historic building on Melrose Avenue in Hollywood, California.  Designed by S. Charles Lee, the structure was built in 1927. It has been used both as a hotel and apartments over the years of its existence, with commercial establishments on the first floor. In 1992, the building was listed on the National Register of Historic Places based on its architecture. In April 2010, the hotel was reopened as the newly restored Hollywood Historic Hotel. Edmon Simonian and his family own the property, and operate a furniture gallery located on the hotel's street level. All of the hotel's facades, common spaces, staircases and 62 rooms were restored to their former 1920s glory following an 18-month interior and exterior renovation. By 2021, the hotel had been stripped of many of its restored components. The lobby no longer includes a fireplace, the walls have been repainted cream, and all the bathrooms have been remodeled with new, more generic tubs, sinks, and mirrors. 

It is Norman Revival in style, in interesting counterpoint to prevailing Spanish Colonial Revival styling in the area at the time.

The address given in its NRHP registration document is "Melrose Boulevard",  but the street is Melrose Avenue.

See also
 List of Registered Historic Places in Los Angeles

References

External links
 https://web.archive.org/web/20100425041136/http://hollywoodhistorichotel.com/index.php

Hotel buildings on the National Register of Historic Places in Los Angeles
Hotel buildings completed in 1927
Apartment buildings in Los Angeles
Hotels in Los Angeles
Buildings and structures in Hollywood, Los Angeles